The Catholic Church in Peru is part of the worldwide Catholic Church, under the spiritual leadership of the Pope, the curia in Rome, and the Peruvian Episcopal Conference.

Catholics compose an estimated 74% of Peru's population. It has produced two famous saints of the "new world": St. Rose of Lima and St. Martin de Porres.

The Peruvian Catholic Church is divided into dioceses and archdioceses:

Demographics
Catholicism has been decreasing for many decades. According to the different census, in 1940, 98.5% of the Peruvian population adhered to Catholicism, decreasing to 94,6% in 1981 and to 81,3% in 2007.

Province of Arequipa
Archdiocese of Arequipa
Diocese of Puno
Diocese of Tacna
Prelature of Ayaviri
Prelature of Chuquibamba
Prelature of Juli
Prelature of Santiago Apóstol de Huancané

Province of Ayacucho
Archdiocese of Ayacucho
Diocese of Huancavelica
Prelature of Caraveli

Province of Cusco
Archdiocese of Cusco
Diocese of Abancay
Prelature of Chiquibambilla
Diocese of Sicuani

Province of Huancayo
Archdiocese of Huancayo
Diocese of Huánuco
Diocese of Tarma

Province of Lima
Archdiocese of Lima
Diocese of Callao
Diocese of Carabayllo
Diocese of Chosica
Diocese of Huacho
Diocese of Ica
Diocese of Lurín
Prelature of Yauyos

Province of Piura
Archdiocese of Piura
Diocese of Chiclayo
Diocese of Chachapoyas
Diocese of Chulucanas
Prelature de Chota

Province of Trujillo
Archdiocese of Trujillo
Diocese of Cajamarca
Diocese of Chimbote
Diocese of Huaraz
Diocese of Huari
Prelature of Moyobamba
Prelature of Huamachuco

Apostolic Vicariates
Apostolic Vicariate of San José de Amazonas
Apostolic Vicariate of Iquitos
Apostolic Vicariate of Jaén in Peru or Saint Francis Xavier
Apostolic Vicariate of Puerto Maldonado
Apostolic Vicariate of Pucallpa
Apostolic Vicariate of Requena
Apostolic Vicariate of San Ramón
Apostolic Vicariate of Yurimaguas

Military Ordinariate
Military Ordinariate of Peru

See also
Pan-Amazonian Ecclesial Network (REPAM)

Sources 

 
Peru
Peru